The AlloSphere is a research facility in a theatre-like pavilion in a spherical shape, of opaque material, used to project computer-generated imagery and sounds. Included are GIS, scientific, artistic, and other information. Located at the University of California, Santa Barbara (UCSB) the AlloSphere grew out of the schools of electrical engineering and computer science, and the Media Arts & Technology program at UCSB.

The AlloSphere is housed at UCSB California NanoSystems Institute building, "CNSI," or Elings Hall, a  facility that opened in 2007. The AlloSphere is intended to integrate technology and media.

The AlloSphere includes a three-story cube that has been insulated extensively with sound-absorbing material, making it one of the largest echo-less chambers in the world. Within the chamber are two hemispheres of 5 meter radii, made of perforated aluminum. These are opaque and acoustically transparent.

There are 26 video projectors, to create as much of a field of vision as possible.

The loudspeaker real-time sound synthesis cluster (140 individual speaker elements plus sub-woofers) is suspended behind the aluminum screen resulting in 3-D audio. Computation clusters include simulation, sensor-array processing, real-time video processing for motion-capture and visual computing, render-farm/real-time ray-tracing and radiosity cluster, and content and prototyping environments.

The AlloSphere was developed by a team of scientists, led primarily by Professor JoAnn Kuchera-Morin, a professor in the field of Composition, of the Media Arts & Technology Program of UCSB.

Selected publications 
 The AlloSphere Offers an Interactive Experience of Nano-sized Worlds https://www.nsf.gov/discoveries/disc_summ.jsp?cntn_id=121535&WT.mc_id=USNSF_1
 Research at the AlloSphere Facility https://www.nsf.gov/news/mmg/mmg_disp.jsp?med_id=73444
 Equipping the AlloSphere, an Environment for Immersive Data Exploration https://www.nsf.gov/awardsearch/showAward?AWD_ID=0855279
 Big Data's People-Changing Machine https://www.forbes.com/sites/quentinhardy/2011/07/11/big-datas-people-changing-machine/
 Marriage of Science & Art https://web.archive.org/web/20160302151948/http://www.ucsbalum.com/Coastlines/2011/Summer/feature_allosphere.html
 Living Data: The Three-Story-High AlloSphere Creates Unique Visualizations http://www.technologyreview.com/photoessay/420413/living-data/
 Sensory Overloader: 3-D Tower Lets Researchers Climb Inside Their Data https://www.wired.com/2010/05/st_allosphere/?pid=2039
 A 360-Degree Virtual Reality Chamber Brings Researchers Face to Face with Their Data https://www.wired.com/2010/05/st_allosphere/?pid=2039
 Enter the AlloSphere: Inside UCSB's Three-Dimensional Immersive Theater, the 21st Century Face of Our Discipline-Bending University http://www.independent.com/news/2008/nov/06/enter-allosphere/

References

External links
 
 Video: Talks Demo: Stunning data visualization in the AlloSphere, JoAnn Kuchera-Morin lecture at TED Talks

Nanotechnology institutions
University of California, Santa Barbara buildings and structures